LG Prada 3.0 (also branded as Prada phone by LG 3.0) is the third phone in the LG Prada phone series. It is the successor to the LG Prada II and the LG Prada.

The device was marketed as a premium high-spec limited-production luxury phone on the weight of its Prada branding. LG and Prada featured a number of celebrities in their marketing campaign for the phone.

Launch and availability
At its UK launch near 27 January 2012, the phone's no-contract retail price was approximately £430. Shortly before late May 2012, it was £400; after May 31, the price was reduced to £239.99; and in September 2012, the price was further reduced to £149.

Asia

Europe
Model numbers LG-KU5400, LG-LU540, LG-SU540, LG-P940, LG-P940h

Hardware
LG Prada 3.0 runs on a dual-core 1 GHz ARM Cortex A-9 (TI OMAP4430) CPU and a PowerVR SGX540 GPU.

This phone has a RAM capacity of 1 GB and 6.2 GB of ROM.

The device has an 8-megapixel primary camera with LED flash, and support for 1080p video recording. The phone also carries a 1.3-megapixel front camera for video calls.

Software
Prada 3.0 comes with Android 2.3 pre-installed. In 2012, LG scheduled a release of Android ICS to several of its smartphone models, including Prada 3.0.

In early July 2012, LG rolled out Android Ice Cream Sandwich 4.0.4 to unlocked P940 models in Germany and Italy. To perform the upgrade, LG's Windows-only support tool and drivers are required to be installed. At the same time, LG also released the upgrade in the UK.

See also
LG Prada (KE850)
LG Prada II

References

 NTT DoCoMo page for LG Prada 3.0

External links
LG Prada 3.0 Website

Android (operating system) devices
LG Electronics smartphones
Mobile phones introduced in 2012
Discontinued smartphones
Prada